The following is a list of the 86 municipalities (comuni) of the Province of Lecco, Lombardy, Italy.

List

See also
List of municipalities of Italy

References

Lecco